Pollanisus commoni is a moth of the family Zygaenidae. It is found along the coast of north-eastern Queensland, Australia.

The length of the forewings is 7–7.5 mm for males and 6.5–7.5 mm for females.

Larvae have been reared on Dillenia alata.

External links
Australian Faunal Directory
Zygaenid moths of Australia: a revision of the Australian Zygaenidae

Moths of Australia
commoni
Moths described in 2005